Omar Enrique Barboza Gutiérrez (born 27 July 1944) is the president of the Venezuelan political party Un Nuevo Tiempo ("A New Era"), in opposition to Nicolás Maduro.

In February 2009 a constitutional amendment to remove term limits on public offices in Venezuela was approved by 54% of voters in the 2009 Venezuelan constitutional referendum. Barboza said "We're democrats. We accept the results," to The Associated Press, but claimed that the results were skewed by Hugo Chávez's broad use of state resources to win the vote, through state-run news media, political pressure on 2 million public employees and frequent presidential speeches (cadenas) which all television stations in Venezuela are required to air, and added that "Effectively this will become a dictatorship."

Sources

 
 

1944 births
A New Era politicians
Living people
People of the Crisis in Venezuela
People from Maracaibo
Speakers of the National Assembly (Venezuela)